A Fraser Filter, named after Douglas Fraser, is typically used in geophysics when displaying VLF data. It is effectively the first derivative of the data.

If  represents the collected data then  is the average of two values. Consider this value to be plotted between point 1 and point 2 and do the same with points 3 and 4: 

If  represents the space between each station along the line then
 is the Fraser Filter of those four values.

Since  is constant, it can be ignored and the Fraser Filter considered to be
.

References

Geophysics
Linear filters